Kara Tepe is a Buddhist archaeological site in the Central Asia region of Bactria, in the Termez oasis near the city of Termez in southern Uzbekistan. The foundations of the site date to the 1st century CE, with a peak of activity around the 3rd and 4th centuries during the Kushan period, before experiencing a fatal decline around the 5th century CE, probably with the invasion of the Kushano-Sassanian, whose coinage can be found on the site.

Site
The site of Kara Tepe is located on a slight height, a few hundred meters from Fayaz Tepe. It can be visited together with the Fayaz Tepe for an extra entrance fee. The site is formed some outdoor constructions together with several caves dug in the hill, covering a surface of 7 hectares, in a type similar to those seen in Gandhara. It is the only troglodyte group found in Central Asia. Some of the artifacts found in the ruins are exhibited in the Fayaz Tepe museum at the entrance of the Fayaz Tepe site.

The "vaulted cave" design seen in Kara Tepe is thought to have been the inspiration for the vaulted caves at Kizil, in particular the Cave of the Hippocampi, dated to 300-350 CE.

Artefacts
Many niches were found that sheltered sculptures of gold or ceramic Buddhas, and awnings rested on impressive colonnades. Remarkably, some of the Buddha statues are surrounded by a full halo, which became current in Turkestan and East Asia after the Kushan period. A Brahmi inscription was also recovered from the site.

See also
 Dalverzin Tepe
 Khalchayan
 Surkh Kotal

References

Archaeological sites in Uzbekistan
Kushan Empire
Sites along the Silk Road